Marion County Airport  is a county-owned public airport located in the unincorporated area of Dunnellon, in Marion County, Florida, United States. In 2014, the general aviation airport averaged 105 flights per day. The complex features two lighted runways with no control tower. During World War II, the airport was used by the United States Army Air Forces for training and was then known as the Dunnellon Army Air Field.

Overview
The Marion County Airport is also known as the Dunnellon Army Airfield. It is owned by the Dunnellon Airport Authority and has recently been moved under the Park and Recreation department under the Marion County BCC at the direction of Mounir Bouyones, the County Administrator. Jim Couillard is the Airport Director and Mike Grawe is the Airport Manager.

The airport is located in unincorporated Marion County, Florida.

The airport and commerce complex encompasses  of land. With new security fencing, electrical gates, a snack bar and additional T-hangars, the airport was not projected to require major expansion through 2020. Services available include 24-hour aviation fuel, minor airframe and minor power plant servicing.

Facilities and aircraft

For the 12-month period ending September 25, 2014, the airport had 38,603 general aviation aircraft operations, an average of 105 per day. At that time there were 107 aircraft based at this airport: 96 single-engine, 4 multi-engine, 1 jet, 1 helicopter and 5 ultralight.

The Marion County Airport hosts several businesses including Central Florida Skydiving, Red Sky Aviation, National Parachute Test Center, DAB Construction, Pratt Aviation, Fowler Aviation, ITEC and the X35 Aero Club.

History

Originally set on  that was purchased in 1942 by Marion County, the facility was opened in August 1942 by the United States Army Air Forces. Known as Dunnellon Army Air Field, it was used as a training airfield with three runways. Control was deeded to Marion County following the end of the war.

On July 1, 1981, Marion County created the Dunnellon Airport Authority to manage the operation, maintenance and improvement of the airport.

In the 1990s, one runway (designated as 14/32) was closed, reducing the airport to its current two: 5/23 and 10/28 (formerly 9/27).

References

External links
 Marion County Airport at Marion County website
 Aerial image as of 5 January 1999 from USGS The National Map
 

1942 establishments in Florida
Airports established in 1942
Airports in Florida
Transportation buildings and structures in Marion County, Florida